Apache ORC (Optimized Row Columnar) is a free and open-source column-oriented data storage format. It is similar to the other columnar-storage file formats available in the Hadoop ecosystem such as RCFile and Parquet. It is used by most of the data processing frameworks Apache Spark, Apache Hive, Apache Flink and Apache Hadoop.

In  February 2013, the Optimized Row Columnar (ORC) file format was announced by Hortonworks in collaboration with Facebook.
A month later, the Apache Parquet format was announced, developed by Cloudera and Twitter.

History

See also

 Apache Spark
 Apache Arrow
 Apache Hive
 Apache NiFi
 Pig (programming tool)
 Trino (SQL query engine)
 Presto (SQL query engine)

References

2013 software
ORC
Cloud computing
Free system software
Hadoop
Software using the Apache license